Tiruchirappalli District is one of the 38 districts, located along the Kaveri River, in Tamil Nadu, India. The headquarters of the district is the city of Tiruchirappalli.

During the British Raj, the district was referred to as Trichinopoly, and was a district of the Madras Presidency; it was renamed upon India's declaration of independence in 1947.

Geography

Tiruchirappalli district lies almost at the exact centre of Tamil Nadu. The district has an area of 4,404 square kilometres. It is bounded in the north by Salem district, Northwest by Namakkal district, in the Northeast by Perambalur District, East by Ariyalur district and Thanjavur District, in the southeast by Pudukkottai district and Sivagangai district, in the south by Madurai district, in the southwest by Dindigul district and, in the west by Karur district. The district shares its borders with 10 other districts, the highest for any district in the state. The Kaveri river flows through the length of the district and is the principal source of irrigation and drinking water.

Kolli Hills form the boundary of Tiruchirapalli and Namakkal districts and Pachaimalai Hills form the Boundary of Salem and Perambalur district with Tiruchirapalli district in the North and North East.

The North most and South most parts of the district are hilly, central part of the district is Kaveri plains. Trichy district is little bit greener than other surrounding districts due to river Kaveri flowing through this district, by splitting the district into North and South.

Demographics

According to 2011 census, Tiruchirappalli district had a population of 2,722,290 with a sex-ratio of 1,013 females for every 1,000 males, much above the national average of 929. 49.15% of the population lives in urban areas. A total of 272,456 were under the age of six, constituting 139,946 males and 132,510 females. Scheduled Castes and Scheduled Tribes accounted for 17.14% and 0.67% of the population respectively. The average literacy of the district was 74.9%, compared to the national average of 72.99%. The district had a total of 698,404 households. There were a total of 1,213,979 workers, comprising 161,657 cultivators, 319,720 main agricultural labourers, 25,174 in house hold industries, 575,778 other workers, 131,650 marginal workers, 9,012 marginal cultivators, 59,062 marginal agricultural labourers, 5,212 marginal workers in household industries and 58,364 other marginal workers.

At the time of the 2011 census, 95.67% of the population spoke Tamil, 2.08% Telugu and 1.10% Urdu as their first language.

Politics 

|}

Taluks

In 2013, Tiruchirappalli district went from nine taluks to eleven taluks.
Thuraiyur taluk
Manapparai taluk
Marungapuri taluk
Srirangam taluk
Tiruchirappalli West taluk 
Tiruchirappalli East taluk
Thiruverumbur taluk
Lalgudi taluk
Manachanallur taluk
Musiri taluk
Thottiyam taluk

Urban centres 

Tiruchirappalli District consists of the following urban centres:
Trichy City

Thuraiyur town
Manapparai town
Thuvakudi town
Lalgudi town panchayat
Manachanallur town panchayat
Musiri town panchayat
Thottiyam town panchayat
Uppiliapuram Town panchayat
Thandalaiputhur panchayat
Navalurkuttapattu panchayat
Mettupalayam panchayat
B.Mettur panchayat
Balakrishnampatti panchayat
Thataiyagarpettai panchayat
mangalam panchayat

Major industries
Bharat Heavy Electricals Limited (BHEL)
High Energy Projectile Factory (HEPF)
Golden Rock Railway Workshop
Ordnance Factory Tiruchirappalli
Light and heavy engineering
Leather Tanneries
Food Processing 
Sugar Mills
(Traditional) Cigar Making (village) Industries
Hosiery and garments (to a small extent)
IT/BPO
Manufacturing of Synthetic Stones for Jewelry

Natural resources and water bodies

The major rivers are the River Kaveri and the River Kollidam.
The important rivers across city is Koraiyar, Uyyakondan and Kudamuruti rivers.

Agriculture
The district has a large cattle and poultry population with agriculture workers in the smaller villages like Kalpalayathanpatti.

The rivers Kaveri and Kollidam start branching out to form the Kaveri delta irrigating vast tracts of land in the district. The major crops are rice (vast tracts); sugarcane (vast tracts); banana/plantain; coconut; cotton (small tracts); betel; maize; and groundnut.

Trichirapalli district is well known for all varieties of Banana Cultivation. Banana research centre is located in Tiruchirapalli Agricultural University.

Hill Jackfruit, Cassava, mountain crops are grown in the Pachaimalai Hills of Trichirapalli district.

Divya Desam Temples 
The first five divya desam temples are located in tiruchirappalli district.

 Srirangam Ranganathaswamy Temple (1st Divya Desam)
 Azhagiya Manavala Perumal Temple (2nd Divya Desam)
 Uthamar Kovil (3rd Divya Desam)  
 Pundarikakshan Perumal Temple (4th Divya Desam)
 Sundararaja Perumal temple (5th Divya Desam)

References

External links

Srirangam 
Tiruchirapalli District

 
Districts of Tamil Nadu